The William F. Jahn Farmstead is located in Mequon, Wisconsin, United States.  The farmstead includes a farmhouse, two barns, a summer kitchen, and two outbuildings.  While the farmstead is not longer used for agriculture, portions have been converted to facilitate bed and breakfast lodging.

History 
Jahn was a German immigrant, arriving with his family at Mequon from Saxony in 1844 at the age of 12. He became a surveyor, Superintendent of Schools for the city, a farmer, and a prominent local politician.  The farm was a successful diversified operation, by 1880 it had grown to 100 acres with dairy cows, pigs, and chickens, and grew wheat, corn, and oats.

The farmstead is significant as a relatively intact and well-preserved example of a Greek Revival farmhouse in Mequon. The property was added to the National Register of Historic Places in 2000.

References

Houses in Ozaukee County, Wisconsin
Farms on the National Register of Historic Places in Wisconsin
German-American culture in Wisconsin
Greek Revival houses in Wisconsin
Houses completed in 1855
National Register of Historic Places in Ozaukee County, Wisconsin